G-Man (plural G-Men) may refer to:

Law enforcement 
 G-man, short for "Government Man", slang for federal law enforcement agents
 G-Men, a reference to a detectives of the Dublin Metropolitan Police force's G Division in early 20th-century Ireland

People 
 G. Gordon Liddy (1930–2021), nicknamed G-Man on his radio show. Liddy was an FBI agent at one time earlier in his life
 Gary Gerould, American sports broadcaster, nicknamed "The G-Man"
 Gerald McClellan (born 1967), former American boxer nicknamed "G-Man"
 Monty Sopp (born 1963), professional wrestler known also as "The G-Man"
 Gez Varley, British techno musician and DJ

Fictional and other
 G-Man (Half-Life), a character in the Half-Life computer game series who is dressed like a government official
 Goatse man, a man on an internet shock site
 A slang word for Godzilla

Other 
 G Men, a 1935 Hollywood crime film
 G-Man (Sonny Rollins album), 1986
 G-Man (Rake album), 1996
 G-Man (comics), a comic written by Chris Giarrusso
 G-men (magazine), a monthly Japanese magazine for gay men
 New York Giants, a National Football League team nicknamed G-Men
 The Pleazers, a 1960s Australian band originally named G-Men

See also
 Junior G-Men, an American boys club in the 1930s and 1940s, and related radio program, books, and films that promoted the FBI